Blackwell Field  is a public-use airport located two nautical miles (2.3 mi, 3.7 km) southeast of the central business district of Ozark, in Dale County, Alabama, United States. The airport is owned by the Town of Ozark. It is included in the FAA's National Plan of Integrated Airport Systems for 2011–2015, which categorized it as a general aviation facility.

Facilities and aircraft 
It has one runway designated 13/31 with an asphalt surface measuring 5,152 by 80 feet (1,570 x 24 m).

For the 12-month period ending March 4, 2010, the airport had 91,500 general aviation aircraft operations, an average of 250 per day. At that time there were 26 aircraft based at this airport: 58% single-engine, 15% multi-engine, 4% jet and 23% helicopter.

References

External links 
 

Airports in Dale County, Alabama